Yao Tettey  is a Ghanaian academic and physician. He is a professor of Pathology at the University of Ghana, and the provost of the university's College of Health Sciences. He also works as a Consultant Pathologist at the Korle-bu Teaching Hospital. He is a fellow of the Royal College of Physicians, the Ghana College of Physicians, and the West African College of Physicians, of which he served as president from 2013 to 2014.

Education 
Tettey obtained his M.B, Ch.B in May 1982 from the University of Ghana. In September 1992, he was awarded his diploma in Clinical Pathology (DCP) from the Royal Postgraduate Medical School, University of London.

Career 
In October 1994, Tettey worked at the Faculty of Laboratory Medicine of the West African Postgraduate Medical College. He was a foundation fellow of the Ghana College of Physicians in 2003, and president of the West African College of Physicians from 2013 to 2014. He is the provost of the University of Ghana's College of Health Sciences. He once served on the Ghana Food and Drugs Board's Technical Advisory Committee on Safety and Monitoring.

References 
 

Living people
Ghanaian pathologists
Alumni of the University of London
20th-century Ghanaian educators
Academic staff of the University of Ghana
Year of birth missing (living people)